"He's Bla-ack!" is the twentieth episode of the twelfth season of the animated comedy series Family Guy and the 230th episode overall. It aired on Fox in the United States on May 11, 2014, and is written by Julius Sharpe and directed by Steve Robertson. The episode features the return of Cleveland Brown after his spin-off was cancelled, serving as the series finale of The Cleveland Show. In the episode, Cleveland and his family return to Quahog. However, his and Peter's friendship is on a knife edge when their wives argue about parenting.

Plot
Joe is bragging to the gang about his sexual exploits with Bonnie when Cleveland returns to Quahog and shows up at the Drunken Clam. Cleveland takes a round of somewhat good-natured ribbing over The Cleveland Show and its many faults, including the show's logo looking like a penis, the show (which has an African-American main cast) being written by white writers, the series having no clear target audience, Tim the Bear not being funny and having his voice actor replaced after season 2, and the show losing to Bob's Burgers (which premiered in 2011 about a white family) in the ratings. Peter then gives Cleveland some Family Guy DVDs to bring him up to speed on what happened during his absence, adding that unlike The Cleveland Show, the Family Guy DVDs contain jokes (Cleveland admits, however, that he doesn't own a DVD player). During the theme song, Cleveland appears and ends up taking Mort's place in the theme song while an embittered Mort heads home.

As Cleveland and Cleveland Jr. move back into their old house and Donna, Roberta, and Rallo move in there with them, Cleveland discovers it has been wrecked due to all of the past residents like Dan Aykroyd and Chevy Chase (as seen in "Spies Reminiscent of Us"), Ryan Reynolds (as seen in "Stewie Goes for a Drive"), and it having once been used as an orphanage. After getting things fixed, the Brown family proceeds with moving in, cleaning up and sorting things. Rallo tries to make friends with Stewie, but Stewie blows him off, calling him a Boondocks rip-off. Chris breaks a vase that belonged to Donna's great-grandmother over Rallo's head. As a result, he's spanked by Donna, which angers Lois, who confronts Donna after finding out. Donna accuses Lois of being a bad parent while Lois accuses her of being a child abuser for spanking her son. They refuse to have anything to do with each other, forbidding their husbands from socializing with each other as well, to Peter and Cleveland's shock.

At the Drunken Clam, Joe plans for Susie's first birthday party as Cleveland walks in. Cleveland and Peter try to decide who must leave, and they decide to find a place where they can hang out without being discovered. They first try meeting on a commercial airline flight, and then later Peter poses as a police officer and pulls Cleveland over so they can talk. To make it look real, Peter beats up Cleveland dressed up as a cop while receiving some assistance from Joe, then Peter and Joe beat Cleveland ten times harder. However, both Peter and Cleveland are caught, resulting in Peter being forced to sleep on the couch after lying to Lois about it while Donna spanks Cleveland. As Chris finds Peter on the couch trying to sleep later that night, he suggests they find a way to get the wives together. Peter then initiates a conversation with Cleveland across the street using a flashlight and Morse code. Peter subsequently implements various crazy plans in an attempt to get their wives to become friends (getting Cleveland injured in a car crash, having nude photographs of children exhibited at an art gallery, and burning an eagle with cigarettes), without success.

At Susie's birthday party, they prepare for the three-legged race. While Lois wants to be Peter's partner, he really wants to be Cleveland's partner and refuses with finality. They both defy their wives and enter together. But when Peter trips and is hurt, Cleveland tries to carry Peter, but settles for hugging and rolling. As the wives look on, they agree to be friends for their husbands' sake, ending their feud. As Peter and Cleveland continue their rolling, they come in second place to two one-legged people who tied themselves together to form one body. Peter and Cleveland celebrate being friends again at the Drunken Clam and the guys once again rag on him for The Cleveland Show.

Reception
Eric Thurm of The A.V. Club gave the episode a B−, opining that the return of Cleveland and "the cheesy flashback montage of bro moments" between him and Peter was cynical but effective, while criticizing the numerous race jokes as subpar.

The episode received a 2.1 rating in the 18–49 years old demographic and was watched by a total of 4.16 million people. This made it the most watched show on Animation Domination that night, beating American Dad!, Bob's Burgers and The Simpsons.

References

External links 
 

Family Guy (season 12) episodes
2014 American television episodes
Crossover animation
The Cleveland Show
Television episodes about child abuse